Cyclohexylbenzene is the organic compound with the structural formula .  It is a derivative of benzene with a cyclohexyl substituent (C6H11).  It is a colorless liquid.

Formation
Cyclohexylbenzene is produced by the acid-catalyzed alkylation of benzene with cyclohexene.  The process can proceed using benzene as the exclusive organic precursor.  Its partial hydrogenation gives cyclohexene, which alkylates the unhydrogenated benzene.

It is also generated by the hydrodesulfurization of dibenzothiophene.

Applications
A route to phenol analogous to the cumene process begins with cyclohexylbenzene, which is oxidized to a hydroperoxide, akin to the production of cumene hydroperoxide. Via the Hock rearrangement, cyclohexylbenzene hydroperoxide cleaves to give phenol and cyclohexanone:

Cyclohexanone is an important precursor to some nylons.

References

Cyclohexyl compounds
Phenyl compounds